McKenzie College was a private career college, located in Sydney, Nova Scotia. The College was founded in 1988 and offered a variety of occupational training programs. In 2018, it permanently closed.

References

Colleges in Nova Scotia
Education in the Cape Breton Regional Municipality
Educational institutions established in 1988
1988 establishments in Nova Scotia
Defunct universities and colleges in Canada
Educational institutions disestablished in 2018
2018 disestablishments in Nova Scotia